Parommidion is a genus of beetles in the family Cerambycidae, containing the following species:

 Parommidion extricatum Martins, 1974
 Parommidion inauditum Napp & Martins, 1984

References

Graciliini